General elections were held in the Socialist Republic of Serbia, a constituent federal unit of SFR Yugoslavia, in December 1990. The presidential elections and the first round of the parliamentary elections were held on 9 December, whilst a second round of the parliamentary elections was held on 23 December 1990. This was the last parliamentary election in Serbia where members were elected in single-member constituency seats; all subsequent elections have taken place under proportional representation.

Background
The elections were boycotted by political parties  of ethnic Kosovar Albanians, who made up around 17% of the population. As a result of the boycott, Kosovo was Milošević's strongest area of support.

Electoral lists 
Following electoral lists are electoral lists that received seats in the National Assembly after the 1990 election:

Results
Slobodan Milošević of the Socialist Party of Serbia (SPS) won the presidential elections, becoming the first elected President of Serbia. whilst the SPS won 194 of the 250 seats in the National Assembly. Opposition parties accused the SPS of voting irregularities. 7,033,610 citizens had the right to vote, 5,029,123 (71.50%) went to the polls. There were 169,461 invalid ballots (3.37%). A large number of candidates competed for the position of President of Serbia, as many as 32.

President

National Assembly

References

External links
Official results

Elections in Serbia
General election
Serbia
Presidential elections in Serbia
Serbia
1990 elections in Serbia
Election and referendum articles with incomplete results